The Washington Huskies college football team competes as part of the NCAA Division I Football Bowl Subdivision (FBS), representing the University of Washington in the North Division of the Pac-12 Conference (Pac-12). Since the establishment of the team in 1889, Washington has appeared in 41 bowl games (the 1938 Poi Bowl the Huskies played in is regarded as an unsanctioned bowl game). Included in these games are 14 appearances in the Rose Bowl Game, one in the Orange Bowl and one Bowl Championship Series (BCS) game appearance. Through the history of the program, nine separate coaches have led the Huskies to bowl games with Don James having the most appearances with 14. With a victory in their most recent bowl game, the 2022 Alamo Bowl, Washington's overall bowl record stands at 20 wins, 20 losses and 1 tie (20–20–1).  The Pac-8 did not allow a second bowl team from the conference until 1975.

Key

Bowl games

Notes

References
General

Specific

Washington Huskies

Washington (state) sports-related lists
Seattle-related lists